This is a list of law enforcement agencies in California, including local (city), county, and statewide agencies. Historic agencies are included.

According to the US Bureau of Justice Statistics' 2008 Census of State and Local Law Enforcement Agencies, the state had 509 law enforcement agencies employing 79,431 sworn peace officers, about 217 for each 100,000 residents.

State agencies 

California Department of Justice 
California Bureau of Investigation - Special Agents
California Bureau of Firearms - Special Agents
California Bureau of Forensic Services - Special Agents
California Bureau of Gambling Control - Special Agents
California Bureau of Medi-Cal Fraud & Elder Abuse - Special Agents
California Highway Patrol
California Department of Corrections and Rehabilitation
California Office of Correctional Safety - State Fugitive Apprehension Teams & Special Service Unit
California Department of Alcoholic Beverage Control - Special Agents
California Department of Fish and Wildlife - Game Wardens
California State Parks Peace Officer
California Department of Toxic Substances Control - Criminal Investigators
California Department of Motor Vehicles Investigations Division - Investigator
California Department of Insurance - Investigations Division
California Franchise Tax Board - Investigations Bureau
California Lottery Security and Law Enforcement Division
California Department of Consumer Affairs - Division of Investigation
California Department of Forestry and Fire Protection - Law Enforcement
California Department of Health Care Services - Investigations Branch
California Department of Public Health, Food and Drug Branch
California Health and Human Services Agency
California Department of State Hospitals - Hospital Police Officers
Office of Law Enforcement Support
Office of Special Investigations
California Department of Developmental Services - Developmental Center Police Officers

County agencies 

Alameda County
Alameda County Sheriff's Office
Alameda County Probation Department
Alpine County Sheriff's Office
Amador County Sheriff's Office
Butte County Sheriff's Department
California Department of Corrections and Rehabilitation already in State Agencies 
Calaveras County Sheriff's Department
Colusa County Sheriff's Office
Contra Costa County Sheriff's Office
Del Norte County Sheriff's Office
El Dorado County Sheriff's Office
Fresno County Sheriff's Department
Glenn County Sheriff's Office
Humboldt County Sheriff's Office
Imperial County Sheriff's Office
Inyo County Sheriff's Office
Kern County
Kern County Sheriff's Office
Kern County Probation Department
Kern County Parks and Recreation: Park Rangers
Kings County Sheriff's Department
Lake County Sheriff's Department
Lassen County Sheriff's Office
 Los Angeles County
Los Angeles County Sheriff's Department
Los Angeles County Probation Department
Madera County Sheriff's Department
Marin County Sheriff's Office
Mariposa County Sheriff's Department
Mendocino County Sheriff's Office
Merced County Sheriff's Office
Modoc County Sheriff's Office
Mono County Sheriff's Department
Monterey County Sheriff's Office
Napa County Sheriff's Department
Nevada County Sheriff's Office
Orange County Sheriff's Department
Placer County Sheriff's Office
Plumas County Sheriff's Office
Riverside County Sheriff's Department
Sacramento County
Sacramento County Sheriff's Department
Sacramento County Park Rangers
San Benito County, California
San Benito County Sheriff's Office
San Benito County Marshal's Office - Closed 2010
San Bernardino County
San Bernardino County Sheriff's Department
San Bernardino County Probation Department
San Diego County
San Diego County Sheriff's Department
San Diego County Probation Department
San Francisco Sheriff's Department
San Joaquin County Sheriff's Department
San Luis Obispo County Sheriff's Department
San Mateo County Sheriff's Office
Santa Barbara County Sheriff's Office
Santa Clara County
Santa Clara County Sheriff's Office
Santa Clara County Park Ranger
Santa Clara County Department of Correction
Santa Cruz County Sheriff's Office
Shasta County Sheriff's Office
Sierra County Sheriff's Office
Siskiyou County Sheriff's Department
Solano County Sheriff's Office
Sonoma County
Sonoma County Sheriff's Department
Sonoma County Park Rangers
Stanislaus County Sheriff's Department
Sutter County Sheriff's Department
Tehama County Sheriff's Office
Trinity County Sheriff's Department
Tulare County Sheriff's Office
Tuolumne County Sheriff's Office
Ventura County Sheriff's Office
Yolo County Sheriff's Department
Yuba County Sheriff's Department

Municipal agencies 

Alhambra Police Department
Arcadia Police Department
Adelanto Police Department
Alameda Police Department
Alturas Police Department
Anaheim Police Department
Anderson Police Department
Angels Camp Police Department
Antioch Police Department
Arcata Police Department
Arroyo Grande Police Department
Arvin Police Department
Atascadero Police Department
Atherton Police Department
Auburn Police Department
Avenal Police Department
Azusa Police Department
Bakersfield Police Department
Baldwin Park Police Department
Banning Police Department
Altadena Police Department
Barstow Police Department
Bear Valley Police Department
Beaumont Police Department
Bell Police Department
Bell Gardens Police Department
Belvedere Police Department
Belmont Police Department
Benicia Police Department
Berkeley Police Department
Beverly Hills Police Department
Bishop Police Department
Blythe Police Department
Brawley Police Department
Brea Police Department
Brentwood Police Department
Brisbane Police Department
Broadmoor Police Department
Buena Park Police Department
Burbank Police Department
Burlingame Police Department
Calexico Police Department
California City Police Department
Calipatria Police Department
Campbell Police Department
Capitola Police Department
Carlsbad Police Department
Carmel-by-the-Sea Police Department
Cathedral City Police Department
Ceres Police Department
Chico Police Department
Chino Police Department
Chowchilla Police Department
Chula Vista Police Department
Citrus Heights Police Department
Claremont Police Department
Clayton Police Department
Clearlake Police Department
Cloverdale Police Department
Clovis Police Department
Coalinga Police Department
Colma Police Department
Colton Police Department
Colusa Police Department
Concord Police Department
Corcoran Police Department
Corning Police Department
Corona Police Department
Coronado Police Department
Costa Mesa Police Department
Cotati Police Department
Covina Police Department
Crescent City Police Department
Culver City Police Department
Cypress Police Department
Daly City Police Department
Danville Police Department
Davis Police Department
Del Rey Oaks Police Department
Delano Police Department
Desert Hot Springs Police Department
Dinuba Police Department
Dixon Police Department
Dos Pablos Police Department
Downey Police Department
East Palo Alto Police Department
El Cajon Police Department
El Centro Police Department
El Cerrito Police Department
El Monte Police Department
El Segundo Police Department
Elk Grove Police Department
Emeryville Police Department
Escalon Police Department
Escondido Police Department
Etna Police Department
Eureka Police Department
Exeter Police Department
Fairfax Police Department
Fairfield Police Department
Farmersville Police Department
Ferndale Police Department
Firebaugh Police Department
Folsom Police Department
Fontana Police Department
Fort Bragg Police Department
Fortuna Police Department
Foster City Police Department
Fountain Valley Police Department
Fowler Police Department
Fremont Police Department
Fresno Police Department
Fullerton Police Department
Galt Police Department
Garden Grove Police Department
Gardena Police Department
Gilroy Police Department
Glendale Police Department
Glendora Police Department
Gonzales Police Department
Grass Valley Police Department
Greenfield Police Department
Gridley Police Department
Grover Beach Police Department
Guadlupe Police Department
Gustine Police Department
Hanford Police Department
Hawthorne Police Department
Hayward Police Department
Healdsburg Police Department
Hemet Police Department
Hercules Police Department
Hermosa Beach Police Department
Hillsborough Police Department
Hollister Police Department
Huntington Beach Police Department
Huntington Park Police Department
Huron Police Department
Imperial Police Department
Indio Police Department
Inglewood Police Department
Ione Police Department
Irvine Police Department
Irwindale Police Department
Jackson Police Department
Kensington Police Department
Kerman Police Department
King City Police Department
Kingsburg Police Department
La Habra Police Department
La Mesa Police Department
La Palma Police Department
La Verne Police Department
Lafayette Police Department
Laguna Beach Police Department
Lakeport Police Department
Lathrop Police Department
Lemoore Police Department (California)
Lincoln Police Department
Lindsay Department of Public Safety
Livermore Police Department
Livingston Police Department
Lodi Police Department
Lompoc Police Department
Long Beach Police Department
Los Alamitos Police Department
Los Altos Police Department
Los Angeles
Los Angeles Police Department
Los Angeles Bureau of Street Services, Investigation and Enforcement Division
Los Angeles Sanitation and Environmental, Compliance and Enforcement Division
Los Banos Police Department
Los Gatos/Monte Sereno Police Department
Madera Police Department
Mammoth Lakes Police Department
Manhattan Beach Police Department
Manteca Police Department
Marina Police Department
Martinez Police Department
Marysville Police Department
McFarland Police Department
Mendota Police Department
Menifee Police Department
Menlo Park Police Department
Merced Police Department
Mill Valley Police Department
Milpitas Police Department
Modesto Police Department
Monrovia Police Department
Montclair Police Department
Montebello Police Department
Monterey Police Department
Monterey Park Police Department
Moraga Police Department
Morgan Hill Police Department
Morro Bay Police Department
Mount Shasta Police Department
Mountain View Police Department
Murrieta Police Department
Napa Police Department
National City Police Department
Nevada City Police Department
Newark Police Department
Newman Police Department
Newport Beach Police Department
Novato Police Department
Oakdale Police Department
Oakland
Oakland Police Department
Oakland Housing Authority Police Department
Oakley Police Department
Oceanside Police Department
Ontario Police Department
Orange Police Department
Orange Cove Police Department
Orinda Police Department
Orland Police Department
Oroville Police Department
Oxnard Police Department
Pacific Grove Police Department
Pacifica Police Department
Palm Springs Police Department
Palo Alto Police Department
Palos Verdes Estates Police Department
Paradise Police Department
Parlier Police Department
Pasadena Police Department
Paso Robles Police Department
Petaluma Police Department
Piedmont Police Department
Pinole Police Department
Pismo Beach Police Department
Pittsburg Police Department
Placentia Police Department
Placerville Police Department
Pleasant Hill Police Department
Pleasanton Police Department
Pomona Police Department
Port Hueneme Police Department
Porterville Police Department
Red Bluff Police Department
Redding Police Department
Redlands Police Department
Redondo Beach Police Department
Redwood City Police Department
Reedley Police Department
Rialto Police Department
Richmond Police Department
Ridgecrest Police Department
Rio Dell Police Department
Ripon Police Department
Riverside Police Department
Rocklin Police Department
Rohnert Park Department of Public Safety
Roseville Police Department
Ross Police Department
Sacramento Police Department
Salinas Police Department
San Bernardino Police Department
San Bruno Police Department
San Carlos Police Department
San Diego Police Department
San Fernando Police Department
San Francisco
San Francisco Police Department
San Francisco Patrol Special Police
San Gabriel Police Department
San Jose Police Department
San Leandro Police Department
San Luis Obispo Police Department
San Marino Police Department
San Mateo Police Department
San Pablo Police Department
San Rafael Police Department
San Ramon Police Department
Sand City Police Department
Sanger Police Department
Santa Ana Police Department
Santa Barbara Police Department
Santa Clara Police Department
Santa Cruz Police Department
Santa Maria Police Department
Santa Monica Police Department
Santa Paula Police Department
Santa Rosa Police Department
Sausalito Police Department
Scotts Valley Police Department
Seal Beach Police Department
Seaside Police Department
Sebastopol Police Department
Selma Police Department
Shafter Police Department
Sierra Madre Police Department
Signal Hill Police Department
Simi Valley Police Department
Soledad Police Department
Sonora Police Department
South Gate Police Department
South Lake Tahoe Police Department
South Pasadena Police Department
South San Francisco Police Department
St. Helena Police Department
Stallion Springs Police Department
Stockton Police Department
Suisun City Police Department (California)
Sunnyvale Department of Public Safety
Susanville Police Department
Sutter Creek Police Department
Taft Police Department
Tehachapi Police Department
Tiburon Police Department
Torrance Police Department
Tracy Police Department
Truckee Police Department
Tulare Police Department
Tulelake Police Department
Turlock Police Department
Tustin Police Department
Ukiah Police Department
Union City Police Department
Upland Police Department
Vacaville Police Department
Vallejo Police Department
Ventura Police Department
Vernon Police Department
Visalia Police Department
Walnut Creek Police Department
Watsonville Police Department
Weed Police Department
West Covina Police Department
West Sacramento Police Department
Westminster Police Department
Westmoreland Police Department
Wheatland Police Department
Whittier Police Department
Williams Police Department
Willits Police Department
Winters Police Department
Woodlake Police Department
Woodland Police Department
Yreka Police Department
Yuba City Police Department

College and University agencies 

Allan Hancock Community College Police Department
Antelope Valley College District Police
Azusa Pacific University Campus Safety
California State University police departments
Cerritos Community College Police Department
Chaffey College Police Department
Chapman University Department of Public Safety
Coastline Community College District Police Department
Coastline Community College Public Safety
College of the Sequoias District Police Department
Compton College Police Department
Contra Costa Community College District Police Services
Crafton Hills Community College Police Services
Cuesta College Police Department
El Camino College Police Department
Fontana Unified School District Police Department
Foothill-De Anza College District Police Department
Fresno State University Police Department
Glendale Community College District Police Department
Goldenwest College Public Safety
Hartnell College Campus Safety Department
Irvine Valley College Police Department
Los Rios Community College Police Department
Merced Community College Police Department
MiraCosta Community College Police Department
Notre Dame de Namur University Department of Public Safety
Napa Valley College Police Department
Palomar College Police Department
Pasadena Area Community College District Police Department
Pepperdine University Department of Public Safety
Riverside Community College District Police
Saddleback College Police Department
Saint Mary's College of California Department of Public Safety
San Bernardino Community College District Police Department
San Diego Community College District Police Department
San Francisco Community College Police Department
San Joaquin Delta College District Police Department
San Jose/Evergreen College District Police Department
San Mateo Community College District Department of Public Safety
Santa Rosa Junior College District Police Department
Santa Monica College Police Department
Shasta College Police Department
Solano Community College Police Department
South Orange County Community College District Department of Campus Safety
Southwestern Community College Police Department
Stanford Department of Public Safety
State Center Community College District Police Department
University of California Police Department
University of the Pacific Police Department
University of San Diego Department of Public Safety
University of San Francisco Department of Public Safety
University of Southern California Department of Public Safety
Ventura County Community College Police Department
Victor Valley College Police Department
West Valley-Mission Community College District Police
Yuba College Police Department

K-12 School Agencies 

Apple Valley Unified School District Police Department
Baldwin Park Unified School District Police Department
Clovis Unified School District Police Department
Compton Unified School District Police Department
Elk Grove Unified School District Police Department
Fontana School District Police Department
Hesperia School District Police Department
Huntington Beach Union High School District Police Department
Inglewood Unified School District Police Department
Kern High School District Police Department
Los Angeles School Police Department
Long Beach Unified School District School Safety Department
Montebello Unified School District Police Department
Norwalk-La Mirada Unified School District School Safety Department
Oakland Unified School District Police Department
San Bernardino City Unified School District Police Department
San Diego City Schools Police Department
Santa Ana Unified School District Police Department
Stockton Unified School District Police Department
Twin Rivers Unified School District Police Department
Val Verde Unified School Police Department
Victor Valley Union High School District Police Department
West Contra Costa Unified School District Police Department

Special District agencies 

 Bay Area Rapid Transit Police Department
 Bear River Police Department
 Bear Valley Police Department (Bear Valley Community Services District)
 Bethel Island Municipal Improvement District (BIMID)
 Blue Lake Rancheria Tribal Police Department
 Broadmoor Police Protection District
 Burbank-Glendale-Pasadena Airport Authority Police
 Compton Municipal Law Enforcement 
 Cahto Tribal Police Department
 Capistrano Bay Police Department (Capistrano Bay Community Services District)
 Central Marin Police Authority
 California Exposition & State Fair Police (Cal Expo Police)
 East Bay Regional Park District Police Department
 Exposition Park Department of Public Safety
 Fulton–El Camino Park Police Department
 Hoopa Valley Tribal Police Department
 Kensington Police Protection and Community Services District
 Kern County Airport Police
 Lake Shastina Police Department (Lake Shastina C.S.D.)
 Long Beach Harbor Patrol
 Long Beach Park Rangers 
 Los Angeles World Airports Police Division
 Los Angeles Department of Recreation and Parks, Park Ranger Division
 Port of Los Angeles Police Division
 Los Angeles Society for the Prevention of Cruelty to Animals Law Enforcement Division
 Midpeninsula Regional Open Space District Ranger Division
 Montebello Park Rangers 
 Monterey County Park Rangers
 Monterey Peninsula Airport Police
 Metropolitan Transit System Police Department
 Napa Valley Railroad Police Department
 Port of Stockton Police
 Round Valley Tribal Police Department
 Sacramento Regional Transit Police
 San Diego Harbor Police (San Diego Unified Port District)
 San Diego Humane Society and SPCA Law Enforcement / Investigations Division
 San Francisco Park Patrol
 Santa Ana Park Rangers
 Santa Cruz Harbor Patrol
 Stallion Springs Police
 Town of Discovery Bay Community Services District (CSD)
 Yurok Tribal Police Department

Federal law enforcement agencies in California 

 ATF
 Bureau of Indian Affairs Police

Department of Defense Police
Defense Logistics Agency Police 
 Federal Bureau of Prisons
 Federal Protective Service
 Federal Reserve Police

 Homeland Security Investigations
 Immigration and Customs Enforcement
 United States Fish and Wildlife Service
 Office of the United States Marshal for the Northern District of California
 Office of the United States Marshal for the Eastern District of California
 Office of the United States Marshal for the Central District of California
 Office of the United States Marshal for the Southern District of California
 United States Coast Guard
 United States Secret Service
 United States Customs and Border Protection
 United States Immigration and Customs Enforcement
 United States Naval Criminal Investigative Service
 United States Department of Veterans Affairs Police
 United States Army Military Police Corps (Civilian/Uniformed) 
 United States Air Force Security Forces (Civilian/Uniformed) 
 Commander, Navy Region Southwest Police (Civilian/Uniformed) 
 United States Postal Service (Special Agents/OIG)
      Main Article * Federal law enforcement in the United States

Defunct agencies 
 California State Police
 California State Rangers
 Alviso Police Department merged into San Jose Police Department
 Avalon Police Department Disbanded - services now provided by the Los Angeles Sheriff's Department
 Blue Lake Police Department - merged with Humboldt County Sheriff's Department and partially replaced by Blue Lake Rancheria Police Department
 Compton Police Department (disbanded in 1998)
 Dorris Police Department Disbanded - Services contracted with Siskiyou County Sheriff's Office
 Dunsmuir Police Department Disbanded - Services contracted with Siskiyou County Sheriff's Office
 Ft. Jones Police Department Disbanded - Services provided by Etna Police Department
 Grossmont-Cuyamaca Community College Police Department - Disbanded - Services provided by San Diego County Sheriff's Department
 Half Moon Bay Police Department Disbanded - Services contracted with San Mateo County Sheriff's Office
 Holtville Police Department Disbanded - Merged into Imperial County Sheriffs' Office
 Housing Authority City of Los Angeles Police Department (disbanded on 12/31/03, area serviced by Los Angeles Police Department)
 Imperial Beach Police Department Disbanded - Merged into San Diego County Sheriff's Department 1982
 Isleton Police Department (Disbanded in 2012, area serviced by Sacramento County Sheriff's Department)
 Los Angeles General Services Police now the Los Angeles Police Department (LAPD) Security Services Division
 Los Angeles Community College District Police Department merged into LASD
 Los Angeles County Office of Public Safety 
 Maricopa Police Department Disbanded - Merged into Kern County Sheriff's Office 
 Maywood-Cudahy Police Department  
 Millbrae Police Department Disbanded - Services contracted with San Mateo County Sheriff's Office
 Montague Police Department Disbanded - Services provided by Siskiyou County Sheriff's Office
 Santa Clara County Transit Police - Services contracted with the Santa Clara County Sheriff's Department Transit Patrol Division
 San Anselmo Police Department
 San Carlos Police Department Disbanded - Services contracted with San Mateo County Sheriff's Office
 San Juan Bautista Police Department  
 San Jose Unified School District Police  
 Southern California Rapid Transit District Police Department 
 Stanton Police Department Disbanded - Merged into Orange County Sheriff's Department in February, 1988
 Trinidad Police Department (Disbanded in 2010) merged with Humboldt County Sheriff's Department and partially replaced by Trinidad Rancheria Police Department
 Twin Cities Police Authority now known as Central Marin Police Authority
 Willows Police Department  disbanded as of 7/1/17.  Services provided by Glenn County Sheriff's Office

See also 

 Crime in California
 Law enforcement in the United States

References 

California
 
Law enforcement agencies